Cayley/A. J. Flying Ranch Airport  is located  east of Cayley, Alberta, Canada.

References

External links
Page about this airport on COPA's Places to Fly airport directory

Registered aerodromes in Alberta
Foothills County